Gennady Vladimirovich Drach (born February 5, 1942) is a Russian scientist in the fields of culturology and history of ancient Greek philosophy. He  is a professor at the Southern Federal University, vice president of the Russian Philosophical Society (Российское философское общество), and a 2007 Honored Scientist of the Russian Federation. He is a member of the Editorial Boards for Humanitarians of the South of Russia and Scientific Thought of Caucasus.

Honors and awards
 Honored Scientist of the Republic of Adygea (2012)
 Honored Scientist of the Russian Federation (2007)
 Honored Scientist of the Republic of Ingushetia (2006)
 Honorary Worker of Higher Professional Education the Russian Federation (2002)

External links
 Faculty of Philosophy and Culture Studies 
 Southern Federal University (in Russian)

Living people
1942 births
Honoured Scientists of the Russian Federation
Russian classical scholars
Academic staff of Southern Federal University